Sanjan railway station is a railway station on the Western Railway in the state of Gujarat, India. Sanjan railway station is 49 km away from Valsad railway station. Passenger, MEMU and few Express trains halt at Sanjan railway station.

On occasion of Parsi festival, Western railway gives stoppage of Gujarat Superfast Express and Flying Ranee trains at Sanjan every year.

References

External links
 Valsad district

Railway stations in Valsad district
Mumbai WR railway division